Old New York may refer to:

Old New York (novellas), a collection of novellas by Edith Wharton
New York City
Futurama, a television show set in "New" (31st century) New York, built on the ruins of "Old" (21st century) New York